Kiribathgoda Gnanananda Thero (born: 1 July 1961) is a Sri Lankan monk. who is the Founder of Mahamevnawa Buddhist Monastery and Shraddha Media Network.

Spiritual biography

Gnanananda became a monk at age 17 on 26 March 1979 under Dambagasare Sumedhankara Thero and Dikwelle Pannananda Thero at Seruwavila. He received a traditional Buddhist academic education and entered the University of Sri Jayewardenepura. He founded Mahamevnawa Buddhist Monastery in August 1999 in Waduwava, Polgahawela. Mahamevnawa Buddhist Monastery now has 58 branch monasteries in Sri Lanka and 28 overseas monasteries in Canada, the United States, Australia, the United Kingdom, Germany Italy, Dubai, South Korea and India.

Teachings
He now teaches Buddhism (Theravada), emphasizing the need to practice it in pure form (i.e. as in the Suttas) and casting off what is not advocated by the Buddha.

 

Thousands of practicing Buddhists are associated with Mahamevnawa.

"Maha Sthupa Wandanawa" conducted on 2 February 2008 at Anuradhapura with participation of over 100,000 disciples, and "Somawathi Stupa Vandanawa" conducted on 8 May 2010 at Somawathiya temple with participation of over 1,000,000 devotees, bear evidence for the popularity his Damma program has achieved.

Gnanananda reintroduced the usage of "Namo Buddhaya" to the Sri Lankan Buddhists as a way of Buddhist greeting. Also, there was a weekly dhamma discussion program telecasted on TNL television named "Namo Buddhaya" in which the Thero participated. He was accused for the death of Gangodawila Soma Thero to take his place in the country.

Publications
Gnanananda thero has written many books based on the teachings of Buddha and also translated many pali written books like Mahavamsa and Nettipakarana. These publications are aimed to emphasize uncontaminated Buddhism that can be understood by anyone who reads it. Some have accused him for the death of famous monk Gangodawila Soma Thero. 

The thera has also instigated a culture in Sri Lanka (traditionally known as Dhamma Dīpa – Island full of Buddha's Teachings) to teach the Buddha's teaching in the national language of Sinhala (සිංහල), even though the teachings are traditionally taught in the Pali language. Many disciples believe that they are now able to teach the Buddha's teachings with the right understanding.

See also
Mahamevnawa Buddhist Monastery
Lakviru FM
Shraddha TV
Radio in Sri Lanka
Television in Sri Lanka
Siri Gautama Sambuddharaja Maligawa

References

External links
 Short Spiritual Biography of Bhikkhu Ñānānanda (Buddha Vision)

Living people
Sri Lankan Buddhist monks
Sri Lankan Theravada Buddhists
Theravada Buddhist spiritual teachers
1961 births
Alumni of the University of Sri Jayewardenepura
Mahamevnawa Buddhist Monastery
Converts to Buddhism from Roman Catholicism
Sinhalese monks